The Coalition for a Drug-Free Greater Cincinnati is an anti-drug organization in Greater Cincinnati.

Rob Portman founded the Coalition for a Drug-Free Greater Cincinnati before becoming a congressman.  The organization advances "a comprehensive effort to address youth substance abuse".

References

Organizations based in Cincinnati